Bidvest Namibia is a business group based in Windhoek, Namibia.
In 1989 under the name Crown National Namibia (Proprietary) Limited Established since 2009 is a fully independent company. The initial public offering took place on 26 Namibia October 2009. Originally it was part of the South African Bidvest Group.

It is a broadly held volume of 600 million Namibian dollars, the third largest company on Namibian Stock Exchange

Bidvest Namibia is divided into 2 sectors. BidCom and BidFish. BidCom covers the commercial side of Bidvest in Namibia, while BidFish covers all the fishing and fish processing, namely Namsov Namibia and United Fishing Enterprises.

References

Companies of Namibia
Companies based in Windhoek
Companies listed on the Namibian Stock Exchange